Kim Clijsters was the defending champion, but did not compete this year due to a recovery from a surgery.

Lindsay Davenport won the title, defeating Venus Williams 7–6(7–4), 5–7, 7–6(7–4) in the final.

Seeds
The first four seeds received a bye into the second round.

Draw

Finals

Top half

Bottom half

External links
 Main and Qualifying draws

2004 WTA Tour